The George  is a Grade II listed public house in Twickenham, in the London Borough of Richmond upon Thames. It is in three adjoining buildings at 32–36 King Street, parts of which date from the late 17th century.

References

17th-century establishments in England
Commercial buildings completed in the 17th century
Grade II listed buildings in the London Borough of Richmond upon Thames
Grade II listed pubs in London
Pubs in the London Borough of Richmond upon Thames
Twickenham